Blowin' is the tenth single by B'z, released on May 27, 1992. This song is one of B'z many number-one singles in Oricon chart, selling over 500,000 copies in its first week. The single was re-released in 2003, and re-entered at #9. It sold over 1,763,000 copies according to Oricon, becoming the 41st best selling single of all time in Japan. The song won "the best five single award" at the 7th Japan Gold Disc Award.

Track listing 
Blowin'
Time

Certifications

References

External links
B'z official website

1992 singles
B'z songs
Oricon Weekly number-one singles
Songs written by Tak Matsumoto
Songs written by Koshi Inaba
BMG Japan singles